The 2016–17 Los Angeles Kings season was the 50th season (49th season of play) for the National Hockey League franchise that was established on June 5, 1967. The Kings did not qualify for the 2017 Stanley Cup playoffs, finishing with 86 points.

In March 2017, former Calgary Flames star Jarome Iginla signed with the Kings to play the remainder of the season there. Iginla retired after the season. Later that same month, longtime broadcaster Bob Miller announced he would retire after the season. This season would also be the last for head coach Darryl Sutter and general manager Dean Lombardi, who would both be fired after the Kings' final regular season game.

Regular season overview

This season marked the 50th anniversary of the Los Angeles Kings, who were looking for another chance at making the playoffs following the team's early exit in the 2016 Stanley Cup playoffs to the San Jose Sharks. The Kings would host the 62nd National Hockey League All-Star Game on January 29, 2017, following the announcement back in January 2016 that the city of Los Angeles would host. During the off-season, forward Anze Kopitar replaced Dustin Brown as team captain, due to Brown's recent goal production drop.

The season would see several ups and downs for the team, ranging from injuries to key players, to younger players from the affiliate team Ontario Reign getting more call ups to the Kings, and some familiar faces from the Kings' 2 championship runs departing. On October 12, 2016, the Kings' starting netminder Jonathan Quick would injure his groin in the team's first game of the season; he would not return until February 25, 2017. Former NHL veteran Peter Budaj would be recalled from the Reign and serve as the starting goaltender in Quick's absence. Budaj would later be traded after Quick's return in exchange for Ben Bishop.

Jeff Carter would lead the team in goal-scoring through the season, surpassing team captain Anze Kopitar, who struggled. He would be voted into the All-Star Game for his performance, along with defenseman Drew Doughty. They are the only players from the Los Angeles Kings representing the team this year. Injuries to forwards Tyler Toffoli and Marian Gaborik (who was injured before the regular season) greatly impacted the scoring. However, it propelled forwards such as Tanner Pearson and Trevor Lewis, to score at a more higher rate than before. Gaborik would return to the ice on November 26, 2016. Toffoli, who was injured on December 20, 2016, would not return until February 4 after missing more than a month of action. On March 1, 2017, the Kings acquired Jarome Iginla in a trade with the Colorado Avalanche, who would put up 6 goals in his only season with the team. This season also marked the debut of 20-year old Adrian Kempe.

The Kings' defense struggled in games and the team relied on the emergence of young defensemen Derek Forbort, Kevin Gravel, and Paul LaDue to aid veterans Drew Doughty, Alec Martinez, Jake Muzzin, Matt Greene, and Brayden McNabb. However, Forbort proved to be the more formidable of the three, and would play all 82 regular season games. Greene would unexpectedly play in his final season with the Kings and the NHL, after he got injured on January 20, 2017, be placed on long-term injured reserve, and would be bought out after the season.

Ultimately the Kings were chasing for a playoff spot all season and, despite the team's best efforts, missed the playoffs for the second time in three years.

Alternate uniform
On September 20, 2016 The Los Angeles Kings revealed a new alternate uniform for the season. Taking cues from their overall history, the jersey is silver with black stripes on the shoulders and sleeves, and a black tail stripe on the bottom; the thin silver stripes on the sleeves represents the team's 2 Stanley Cup Championships. The inner neckline of the jersey is purple, featuring 5 gold diamonds honoring the team's 50th anniversary. The Kings' jersey set contains 2 patches on the shoulders, one for the 50th Anniversary worn on the right shoulder and an All-Star patch worn on the left shoulder. Following the All-Star Break, the left shoulder patch would disappear. A patch honoring Bob Miller's 44 years of broadcasting Los Angeles Kings home games took over the left shoulder during the team's final 2 games.

Standings

Schedule and results

Pre-season

Regular season

Player statistics
Final Stats

Skaters

Goaltenders

†Denotes player spent time with another team before joining the Kings. Stats reflect time with the Kings only.
‡Traded mid-season. Stats reflect time with the Kings only.
Bold/italics denotes franchise record

Transactions 
The Kings have been involved in the following transactions during the 2016–17 season:

Trades

Notes

Free agents acquired

Free agents lost

Claimed via waivers

Lost via waivers

Lost via retirement 

Vincent LeCavalier

Player signings

Draft picks

Below are the Los Angeles Kings' selections at the 2016 NHL Entry Draft, held on June 24–25, 2016, at the First Niagara Center in Buffalo.

Notes

 The Los Angeles Kings' first-round pick went to the Carolina Hurricanes as the result of a trade on February 25, 2015, that sent Andrej Sekera to Los Angeles in exchange for Roland McKeown and this pick (being conditional at the time of the trade). The condition – Carolina will receive a first-round pick in 2016 if Los Angeles fails to qualify for the 2015 Stanley Cup playoffs – was converted on April 9, 2015.
The Los Angeles Kings' third-round pick went to the Philadelphia Flyers as the result of a trade on January 6, 2016, that sent Vincent Lecavalier and Luke Schenn to Los Angeles in exchange for Jordan Weal and this pick.
 The Los Angeles Kings' sixth-round pick went to the Philadelphia Flyers as the result of a trade on June 27, 2015, that sent Columbus' fourth-round pick in 2015 to Los Angeles in exchange for a fourth-round pick in 2015 and this pick.

References

Los Angeles Kings seasons
Los Angeles Kings
LA Kings
LA Kings
National Hockey League All-Star Game hosts